A House of Scientists was an independent form of uniting workers from scientific institutions and higher schools established in various cities initialing during Soviet era. The first was opened in Petrograd on January 31, 1920 following a decision by the Petrograd Soviet. This was initiated by the Petrograd Commission for the Improvement of the Life of Scientists (PetroKUBU). Part of its role was to provide accommodation for elderly scientists.

List of Houses of Scientists
 House of Scientists (Dnepropetrovsk)
 
 
 
 
 
 House of Scientists (Krasnoyarsk)
 
 
 
  
 
 House of Scientists (Odessa)
 
 
 
 
 House of Scientists (St. Petersburg)
 House of Scientists in Lesnoy
 House of Scientists (Sarov)
 , Akademgorodok (Tomsk)
 
 , Troitsk, Moscow
 House of Scientists (Ufa)
  
 , Zhukovsky, Moscow Oblast

References

Houses of Scientists
Scientific organizations based in the Soviet Union
Buildings and structures built in the Soviet Union